Hinsdale is an unincorporated community and census-designated place in Valley County, Montana, United States. The town's population was 217  and the community's population as a whole was 583 as of the 2010 census. The community is located on the Milk River and U.S. Route 2, with Montana Highway 537 headed north out of town and South Bench Road crossing the railroad tracks and running south of town. Hinsdale has a post office with ZIP code 59241.

Communities and Ghost Towns
There are smaller communities and ghost towns left over from the Homestead Period that fall under the Hinsdale community.
Barr
Beaverton
Genevieve
Happy Flats
Miles Crossing
Tampico
Vandalia
Theony

History
Native American tribes lived in the local area for thousands of years before European colonization. This colonization brought horses which greatly improved life on the prairie. The steady eastward march of settlers pushed new tribes into the area.

1800s
The Corps of Discovery reached the head of the Milk River in May 1805. There, the river received its name, for "the water of this river possesses a peculiar whiteness, being about the colour of a cup of tea with the admixture of a tablespoonfull of milk."

After the Corps of Discovery, the next major event in the area was the arrival of Texas cattle coming to fatten up on the local grass after their long cattle drives. The cattle drives lasted from 1866 until the late 1880s.

The area was used and claimed by various Native American Tribes. The Act of May 1, 1888 ceded a large area of land, including Hinsdale, from the tribes and opened the area up to homesteading  

Hinsdale was created when the railroad came through. A post office was established in 1891. The area became populated with homesteaders seeking farm ground in the newly opened land  The original site, or Old Hinsdale, was located roughly one and a half miles east of the present town site. The old site was once owned by Bob Walsh, aka "Six-shooter Bob." The present town site was originally owned by William Woolridge, who was the depot agent in 1897.

The first schoolhouse in the community was built by James Deegan and Los Blackmon near the old Deegan ranch. The first schoolhouse in new Hinsdale, a log building, was located on the current school grounds.

1900s
Hinsdale has had two newspapers in the past. The Montana Homestead ran from 1904-1912 The better known Hinsdale Tribune ran from 1912-1971. The Hinsdale Tribune merged with The Saco Independent to form the Independent Tribune for a few years in the 1970s.
While the rest of the country was booming in the roaring twenties, Montana was in a drought. Montana was the only state in the union to have a decrease in population during that time. Though far removed from the center of the Dust Bowl, Hinsdale did see a few dust storms during the Great Depression. Times were tough and most of the settlers who toughed it out and stayed lived mostly by subsistence farming.
The 1980s was a tough time in agriculture across the country. The community of Hinsdale suffered greatly as the period saw one of the worst droughts in the areas history.

2000s
The second decade of the 21st century has seen unusual and record breaking weather for Hinsdale. During the winter of 2010–2011, more than  fell in neighboring Glasgow, Montana. This led to severe flooding in the spring due to runoff. A second flood period occurred later in the spring as the soil was saturated and all of the water once again rushed into the streams and the Milk River.
The summer of 2014 was unusually wet. After several weeks of small, scattered rainstorms, a larger system rolled through in late August. The storm dropped several inches of rain as it made its way across Montana. Hinsdale received seven inches rain over a three-day period. This induced the third hundred‑year‑flood that Hinsdale had experienced in three years.

Demographics

As of the 2010 Census, there were 583 people and 240 occupied homes in the Hinsdale CCD. There were 294 males and 289 females. The largest age group was ages 50–64 with 148 individuals.

Population Census
 

Hinsdale is the 7th CCD of Valley County and Hinsdale Rural was the 4th. Hinsdale was not a unique district in the 1900 U.S. Census, so there is no population data from that census. Since Hinsdale is not and never has been an incorporated town, neither the town or the community are easily defined. The census districts are one of the more accurate ways of defining the town and community. They also reflect how smaller communities in the area evaporated and the Hinsdale area grew despite a dwindling population in the 20th century.

Hinsdale All of the areas listed in the chart are CCDs, Census County Divisions. In 2010, the town of Hinsdale was created as a CDP, Census Designated place. This means that there are two population numbers for Hinsdale.  The smaller is the population of the town (CDP) and the larger is the whole community, including the town (CCD).

Geography and Climate

Hinsdale is located at  (48.404783, -107.086867). The town is located on the Milk River just above the flood plain. A cut bank separates the town from the county park on the river's edge. U.S. Highway 2 runs east and west on the south side of town, with the railroad tracks running parallel south of the highway. Just south of town is the south bench, with marks the edge of the terrace than makes up the majority of south Valley County. The terrace is a raised area that was not cut down as far by erosion compared to the Milk River Valley. Numerous soil horizons, including multiple layers of sandstone, are visible in the bench.

Hinsdale was once on the edge of the inland sea of North America. As the Rocky Mountains began to rise, they were eroded and sediment filled in the sea. as the Rocky Mountain Front continued to gain elevation and increase the slope of the land, water began to erode away the sediment that had been deposited. At this point, the Missouri River flowed north past Big Sandy, entered what is now the Milk River Valley, and flowed along its course past Hinsdale. Around what is now Poplar, the Missouri turned north and eventually flowed into the Hudson Bay.

During the last series of ice ages, the flow of the Missouri was diverted to its current riverbed. The Milk River now flows through part of the Missouri's ancient riverbed. The continental glaciers also deposited large amounts of rocks and sediment on the landscape.

Climate
According to the Köppen Climate Classification system, Hinsdale has a semi-arid climate, abbreviated "BSk" on climate maps.

Schools

Hinsdale Public Schools teaches grades K-12, serving elementary, middle school, and high school. The school district is District No. 7C in Valley County. The Hinsdale Public School District is one of the other employers in the community, supply many teaching and support positions. This is a K-12 class C school. The Hinsdale School has two wings, one for the high school and one for the elementary. The two wings are joined by the administration offices and the cafeteria. The two wings form an L-shape and the octagonal-shaped gymnasium occupies the inside angle of the high school and elementary. The school mascot is the Raider and the school colors are maroon and white. The high school offers track and field on its own, basketball and volleyball through the North Country Mavericks co-op with Saco and Whitewater, and football through the co-op with Glasgow.

Business and Industry
The main employment of Hinsdale is agriculture. Most farms and ranches in Hinsdale are family owned and generational, in that they are passed from one generation to the next. Most of these operations were founded when the area was opened up to homesteading. Some, such as the Canen Ranch and McColly Ranch, have celebrated over 100 years of operation. Some of the primary commodities produced in the area include beef cattle, hard red wheats, and forages.

The community is also supported by a First Community Bank branch, Post Office, bar and cafe, pottery shop, ice cream shop, gunsmith, leathersmith, beauty parlor, gas station and convenience store, and other small businesses.

Community
Hinsdale hosts an Independence Day celebration every year over the 3rd and 4 July. This event, known as Milk River Days, began as a bicentennial celebration in 1976. The two-day event boasts a rodeo, street dance, parade, picnic, fireworks, and many other activities. There is also an All School Reunion every five years (on years ending in 6 and 1) for the alumni of Hinsdale High School.

Belly Bump is a basketball tournament for the alumni of Hinsdale High School. Belly Bump was founded by Kurt Rosendale in 1978. Mike Jones continued the tradition from the 1980s through the mid‑1990s. Jared Albus organized the tournament until 2000. The tournament did not take place for over a decade until Levi Capdeville and Nate Remmich revived the tradition in 2013.

References

External links

 Hinsdale Schools
 Glasgow Area Chamber of Commerce and Agriculture's page on Hinsdale

Census-designated places in Montana
Census-designated places in Valley County, Montana
Unincorporated communities in Montana
Unincorporated communities in Valley County, Montana